Potterspury Lodge School is a Cambian Group school in Northamptonshire, England. It is an Independent School which caters for children with ASD [autism spectrum disorder] alongside behavioural, SEMH, or barriers to learning.  In February 2020 the school achieved a double "Good" from Ofsted for the educational and residential provisions.  In August 2020 students achieved the best ever grades in the school's 64 year history.  The grades achieved far exceeded the national averages for special schools with 25% of all passes in English and Maths achieved at Grades 9-5 against the national average for special schools of just 1% (DfE 2018/19 data).

In January 2021 Ofsted awarded the residential provision Children's Home status, this has allowed the school to expand the capacity for the provision to admit 38 and 52 week students.

Location
Located on the A5 road between Towcester and Milton Keynes. Roughly five miles away from Silverstone (where the British Grand Prix is held), Potterspury Lodge School is set in the countryside near where Northamptonshire borders Buckinghamshire.

Because of the location the school is in, it tries to make as much of it as possible. The school's grounds contain a sports field, an adventure playground, fishing lake, sports hall, tennis court, basketball court, and skate park.

Curriculum
As an independent school, Potterspury Lodge sets its own curriculum which is constructed around students needs and starting points. Students follow a broad and balanced curriculum with a core offer of English, Maths, and Science together with options such as Art, Food Technology, Geography, History, Media, Music, Physical Education, and the Project Qualification.  Students generally follow GCSE pathways at KS4 although some will engage with an Entry Level offer.  At Sixth Form students follow a pathways to adulthood model with some engaging in college courses alongside their studies at the school to fully prepare for a successful transition post 18.

Special needs
Previously the school was mostly used for children who had problems behaving or being in a classroom situation but recently the profile of students is ASD hence students who are on the autism spectrum, The school employs a Clinical Psychologist, Mental Health Nurse, Highly Specialised Speech and Language Therapist, and Occupational Health Practitioner. The school also benefits from a visiting Consultant Child and Adolescent Psychiatrist.

Acquirement by Cambian
In July 2015, Cambian Group bought the school. Cambian were then bought by US firm Caretech in 2018.

Gallery

External links
Homepage
[http://www.ofsted.gov.uk/oxedu_providers/full/(urn)/122136 Ofsted information
Ofsted information part 2
Ofsted notice to improve services July 2018

Private schools in West Northamptonshire District
Boys' schools in Northamptonshire
Schools for people on the autistic spectrum
Special schools in West Northamptonshire District
Educational institutions established in 1956
1956 establishments in England